Vidigulfo is a comune (municipality) in the Province of Pavia in the Italian region Lombardy, located about 20 km southeast of Milan and about 15 km northeast of Pavia.

Vidigulfo borders the following municipalities: Bornasco, Ceranova, Lacchiarella, Landriano, Marzano, Siziano, Torrevecchia Pia.

References

Cities and towns in Lombardy